Since the emergence of the Big Bang theory as the dominant physical cosmological paradigm, there have been a variety of reactions by religious groups regarding its implications for religious cosmologies. Some accept the scientific evidence at face value, some seek to harmonize the Big Bang with their religious tenets, and some reject or ignore the evidence for the Big Bang theory.

Background
The Big Bang itself is a scientific theory, and as such, stands or falls by its agreement with observations. However, as a theory which addresses the nature of the universe since its earliest discernible existence, the Big Bang carries possible theological implications regarding the concept of creation out of nothing. Many atheist philosophers have argued against the idea of the Universe having a beginning – the universe might simply have existed for all eternity, but with the emerging evidence of the Big Bang theory, both theists and physicists have viewed it as capable of being explained by theism; a popular philosophical argument for the existence of God known as the Kalam cosmological argument rests in the concepts of the Big Bang. In the 1920s and 1930s, almost every major cosmologist preferred an eternal steady state universe, and several complained that the beginning of time implied by the Big Bang imported religious concepts into physics; this objection was later repeated by supporters of the steady-state theory, who rejected the implication that the universe had a beginning.

Hinduism
The view from the Hindu Puranas is that of an eternal universe cosmology, in which time has no absolute beginning, but rather is infinite and cyclic, rather than a universe which originated from a Big Bang. However, the Encyclopædia of Hinduism, referencing Katha Upanishad 2:20, states that the Big Bang theory reminds humanity that everything came from the Brahman which is "subtler than the atom, greater than the greatest." It consists of several "Big Bangs" and "Big Crunches" following each other in a cyclical manner.

The Nasadiya Sukta, the Hymn of Creation in the Rigveda (10:129), mentions the world beginning from nothing through the power of heat. This can be seen as corresponding to the Big Bang theory.

Several prominent modern scientists have remarked that Hinduism (and also Buddhism and Jainism by extension as all three faiths share most of these philosophies) is the only religion (or civilization) in all of recorded history, that has timescales and theories in astronomy (cosmology), that appear to correspond to those of modern scientific cosmology, e.g. Carl Sagan, Niels Bohr, Erwin Schrödinger, Werner Heisenberg, Robert Oppenheimer, George Sudarshan, Fritjof Capra etc. Sir Roger Penrose is among the present-day physicists that believe in a cyclical model for the Universe, wherein there are alternating cycles consisting of Big Bangs and Big Crunches, and he describes this model to be "a bit more like Hindu philosophy" as compared to the Abrahamic faiths.

Christianity

The Big Bang theory was partly developed by a Catholic priest, Georges Lemaître, who believed that there was neither a connection nor a conflict between his religion and his science. At the November 22, 1951, opening meeting of the Pontifical Academy of Sciences, Pope Pius XII declared that the Big Bang theory does not conflict with the Catholic concept of creation.
Some Conservative Protestant Christian denominations have also welcomed the Big Bang theory as supporting a historical interpretation of the doctrine of creation; however, adherents of Young Earth creationism, who advocate a very literal interpretation of the Book of Genesis, tend to reject the theory.

Baháʼí Faith

Bahá’u’lláh, the founder of the Baháʼí Faith, has taught that the universe has "neither beginning nor ending". In the Tablet of Wisdom ("Lawh-i-Hikmat", written 1873–1874). Bahá'u'lláh states: "That which hath been in existence had existed before, but not in the form thou seest today. The world of existence came into being through the heat generated from the interaction between the active force and that which is its recipient. These two are the same, yet they are different." The terminology used here refers to ancient Greek and Islamic philosophy (al-Kindi, Avicenna, Fakhr al-Din al-Razi and Shaykh Ahmad). In an early text, Bahá’u’lláh describes the successive creation of the four natures heat and cold (the active force), dryness and moisture (the recipients), and the four elements fire, air, water and earth. About the phrase "That which hath been in existence had existed before, but not in the form thou seest today," 'Abdu'l-Bahá has stated that it means that the universe is evolving. He also states that "the substance and primary matter of contingent beings is the ethereal power, which is invisible and only known through its effects... Ethereal matter is itself both the active force and the recipient... it is the sign of the Primal Will in the phenomenal world... The ethereal matter is, therefore, the cause, since light, heat, and electricity appear from it. It is also the effect, for as vibrations take place in it, they become visible...".

Jean-Marc Lepain, Robin Mihrshahi, Dale E. Lehman and Julio Savi suggest a possible relation of this statement with the Big Bang theory.

Islam

Writing for the Kyoto Bulletin of Islamic Area Studies, Haslin Hasan and Ab. Hafiz Mat Tuah wrote that modern scientific ideas on cosmology are creating new ideas on how to interpret the Quran's cosmogonical terms. In particular, some modern-day Muslim groups have advocated for interpreting the term al-sama, traditionally believed to be a reference to both the sky and the seven heavens, as instead referring to the universe as a whole.

Mirza Tahir Ahmad, head of the Ahmadiyya community, asserted in his book Revelation, Rationality, Knowledge & Truth that the Big Bang theory was foretold in the Quran. He referenced the verse 30 of the Sūrat al-Anbiyāʼ, which says that the heavens and the earth were a joined entity. :

This view that the Qu'ran references the initial singularity of the Big Bang is also accepted by many Muslim scholars outside of the Ahmadiyya community such as Muhammad Tahir-ul-Qadri, who is a Sufi scholar, and Muhammad Asad, who was a nondenominational Muslim scholar. Further, some scholars such as Faheem Ashraf of the Islamic Research Foundation International, Inc. and Sheikh Omar Suleiman of the Yaqeen Institute for Islamic Research argue that the scientific theory of an expanding universe is described in Sūrat adh-Dhāriyāt:

References

Further reading
 Leeming, David Adams, and Margaret Adams Leeming, A Dictionary of Creation Myths. Oxford University Press (1995), .
 Pius XII (1952), "Modern Science and the Existence of God," The Catholic Mind 49:182–192.
 Ahmad, Mirza Tahir, Revelation, Rationality, Knowledge & Truth Islam International Publications Ltd (1987), . The Quran and Cosmology
 Wickman, Leslie, "God of the Big Bang: How Modern Science Affirms the Creator," Worthy Publishing (2015), .

External links 
 God and the Big Bang: featuring Professors Peter Bussey, Gerald Gabrielse, Owen Gingerich, Nick Saunders, and Jennifer Wiseman. It discusses the connection between the Big Bang and God from a Christian perspective.
 Big Bang Theory and Religion, by Ron Kurtis, Physicist
 Cosmic Controversy: The Big Bang and Genesis 1 published by the American Scientific Affiliation, an organisation of Christians in the sciences.
 

Big Bang
Religious cosmologies
Religion and science